Piero Poli (born 9 October 1960) is an Italian competition rower and Olympic champion.

He competed in the men's coxed pair event at the 1984 Summer Olympics. He received a gold medal in quadruple sculls at the 1988 Summer Olympics in Seoul, together with Agostino Abbagnale, Davide Tizzano, and Gianluca Farina.

He is also a World champion: he won the bronze medal in quadruple sculls at the 1983 World Rowing Championship (Duisburg).
In that year he was trained at the Pavia College Remiero.

References

1960 births
Living people
Italian male rowers
Olympic rowers of Italy
Olympic gold medalists for Italy
Rowers at the 1984 Summer Olympics
Rowers at the 1988 Summer Olympics
Olympic medalists in rowing
Medalists at the 1988 Summer Olympics
World Rowing Championships medalists for Italy
People from Cairo Montenotte
Sportspeople from the Province of Savona